Syrian protests may refer to:
 1936 Syrian general strike
 1964 Hama riot
 1999 Latakia protests
 2004 Al-Qamishli riots
 Civil uprising phase of the Syrian Civil War (2011)
 Syrian protests (2016)
 2020 Suweida protests in the southern Syrian city of Suweida

See also
History of Syria